This is a list of National Football League quarterbacks who have led the regular season in passing touchdowns each year. The record for touchdown passes in a season is held by Peyton Manning of the Denver Broncos who threw 55 in 2013. Tom Brady has led the NFL in passing touchdowns in five different seasons, more than any other quarterback; he is also the only quarterback to lead the NFL in passing touchdowns in three different decades.

Passing touchdown leaders

Top 25 Single Season Passing Touchdown Seasons

Other leagues

All-America Football Conference (AAFC)

American Football League (AFL)

Most titles

Johnny Unitas is the only player to win four titles in a row.  Three players (Steve Young, Dan Marino and Brett Favre) have won three in a row.

See also
List of National Football League season passing yards leaders
List of National Football League season pass completion percentage leaders
List of National Football League season passer rating leaders
List of National Football League career passing touchdowns leaders
List of National Football League career passing yards leaders

References
Pro-Football-Reference.com

Passing touchdowns leaders
National Football League lists